In My Life is the second studio album by the Latin Freestyle artist George Lamond. It was released on September 15, 1992, by Columbia Records. The album spawned three singles, the first “Where Does That Leave Love,” reached #66 on the U.S. Billboard Hot 100. The second single was a cover version of New Kids on the Block song "Baby, I Believe In You". The album’s third and final single, “I Want You Back” was released Spring, 1993 and made it to #33 on Billboards "Dance Club Songs".

Track listing 

1992 albums
George Lamond albums